Vodka sauce also known as pink sauce is a sauce used in Italian-American cuisine, made from a smooth tomato sauce, vodka, typical Italian herbs, and heavy cream (which gives the sauce its distinctive orange color).

References

Tomato sauces
Italian sauces